The South Maitland coalfields was the most extensive coalfield in New South Wales until the great coal mining slump of the 1960s. It was discovered by Lieutenant-Colonel William Paterson's party when they were engaged in an exploratory visit to the Hunter River Valley during July 1801.

Mention has been made that coal was being mined in the area during the 1840s, and about 1850 an outcrop in the vicinity of Mount Vincent was reported to the authorities. Several years later, Mr. Bourn Russell also known as Captain Russell commenced operations in a small way at Stoney Creek, Homeville (New South Wales), near Farley. The potential wealth of the coalfields was brought forward in 1886 by Professor Tannatt William Edgeworth David who located an outcrop of first grade coal at Deep Creek, near the present township of Abermain. This gentleman was instrumental in having the whole coal-bearing area, estimated at 20,000 acres (81 km²), reserved for mining purposes.

The coalfields were subsequently served by the South Maitland Railway which left the New South Wales Government Railways' Great Northern Railway above Maitland at the East Greta Junction, 20 miles 65 chains (33.49 km) north of Newcastle. This railway was in fact a considerable number of lines which all, at some point, merged, but had different original ownerships. On 22 November 1918 the first meeting took place of the South Maitland Railways Proprietary Limited, a company incorporated with a capital of £500,000 in £1 shares, and this company eventually acquired the entire coalfields railway network. The line remains open serving the last remaining Colliery at Pelton.

The two companies which came to dominate the district were Caledonian Collieries Limited, and J & A Brown & Abermain-Seaham Collieries Limited (a merger of three formerly separate companies). These two companies merged in 1960 forming Coal & Allied, that bought Hebburn Co in July 1967.

List of collieries and proprietors
  

 East Greta No.1 (1891, East Great Coal Mining Co; closed 24 Sept 1929 - Depression)
East Greta No.2  (1896, ditto)
 Glen Greta (1930–1931)
 Glen Ayr (1914, Glen Ayr Colliery Co.,1930, flooded)
 Ayrfield No.1, Heddon Greta, (1918–1933, fire)
Ayrfield No.2, Heddon Greta, (1924–1930, flooded)
Heddon Greta (closed after a fire and then flooding, 1912)
 Stanford Merthyr No.1, Kurri Kurri (1901, East Greta Coal Mining Co, later J & A Brown etc. Major mine, closed 1960s)
 Pelaw Main, Kurri Kurri, (Dec 1901, J & A Brown closed 1960s)
Richmond Main, near Kurri Kurri (1890, John Scholey syndicate, later J & A Brown, highest daily production in New South Wales; closed 1967)
Hebburn No.1, Weston, (1903, A.A.Co., then Hebburn Coal Co., 1958)
Hebburn No.2,  S of Weston, (1918, Hebburn Coal Co., from 1967 J & A Brown)
Hebburn No.3 or Elrington, near Abernethy, (1924, Hebburn Coal Co., later BHP Co.Ltd.,1962)
Greta Main, Weston, (1922, E S & B Jefferies, 1935, flooded)
 Abermain No.1 (Abermain Collieries Ltd.,1960)
Abermain No.2, Kearsley, (first mechanised pit in the area)(1912, Abermain Collieries Ltd., 1964)
Abermain No.3, Neath, (1923, Abermain & Seaham Collieries Ltd., 1960)
Neath (1906, Wickham & Bullock Island Coal Mining Co., from 1933 Cessnock Collieries Ltd., 1961)
Aberdare (Aberdare Collieries Co. Ltd., till 1905 then Caledonian Collieries Ltd., 1960)(from 1946, open-cut)
Aberdare South (or Abernethy Main) (1917, Caledonian Collieries Ltd., by 1940)
Aberdare Central, Kitchener, (1917, Caledonian Collieries Ltd., c1960)
Aberdare Extended, Cessnock, (1906, Caledonian Collieries Ltd, 1963)
Hill End Colliery, owned by the Hill End Colliery Company, when it closed in 1931.
Cessnock No.1 (Kalingo Colliery) (1927, Wickham & Bullock Island Coal Mining Co., from 1933 Cessnock Collieries Ltd., 1964)
Cessnock No.2 (1917, Wickham & Bullock Island Coal Mining Co., from 1933 Cessnock Collieries Ltd., 1955)
 Bellbird, south of Cessnock, (1908, Hetton Coal Mining Co.)
Pelton (1916, Newcastle-Wallsend Coal Co.)
Stanford Main No.2, Paxton,  SW of Cessnock, the most southerly of the South Maitland coalfields' mines (1922, East Greta Coal Mining Co; 1934 J & A Brown etc., 1961)
Maitland Main (from 1929)  SW of Cessnock (1921 as Greta Main Colliery)
 Millfield Greta,  SW of Cessnock (1924, Millfield Greta Coal Co., later RW Miller)

References

 Eardley, Gifford H., The Railways of the South Maitland Coalfields, published by the Australian Railway Historical Society, NSW Division, Sydney, 1969, National Library of Australia Catalogue number AUS 69-2539

Coal companies of Australia
Geography of New South Wales
Maitland, New South Wales
Geology of New South Wales
Coal mining in New South Wales